Tetyana Kurkudym (born 20 May 1980) is a Ukrainian former competitive ice dancer. She and partner Yuriy Kocherzhenko began competing together internationally in 1995. In the 1998–99 season, they medaled at their ISU Junior Grand Prix assignments, taking gold in France and bronze in Germany, and placed fifth at the 1999 World Junior Championships, held in Zagreb in November 1998. In the second half of the season, they competed on the senior level at the 1999 World Championships in Helsinki. They were coached by Yulia Moskalska and then Alexander Tumanovsky.

Programs 
(with Kocherzhenko)

Competitive highlights 
(with Kocherzhenko)

References 

Ukrainian female ice dancers
Living people
1980 births
Sportspeople from Odesa